The Clair–Fort Kent Bridge is a steel truss bridge crossing the Saint John River between Clair, New Brunswick in Canada and Fort Kent, Maine in the United States.

The bridge handles approximately 279,490 vehicle crossings per year and forms a border crossing on the International Boundary. It connects with Route 205 in New Brunswick and Route 161 and U.S. Route 1 (US 1) in Maine, also forming the northern terminus of US 1.

Since it is an international bridge, the Canadian portion of the structure is the responsibility of the Province of New Brunswick, while the American portion is operated by the State of Maine. The bridge was built in 1929–30 as a replacement for an existing cable ferry and a cable suspension footbridge.

In 1995, the first pier from the New Brunswick abutment had major repairs done. In 1997, the steel members under the deck in the first 1.5 spans from the New Brunswick end were sandblasted, and then painted with a primer of inorganic zinc. In the same year, the downstream exterior stringers in these 1.5 spans were replaced. In 1998, the downstream concrete curb in the first 1.5 spans from the New Brunswick end was replaced. In 2000, the New Brunswick end concrete abutment underwent a major restoration.

Replacement 
In January 2011, the Maine Department of Transportation imposed a 2.7 ton weight restriction on the bridge after advanced deterioration of the bridge on Maine's side was discovered during a routine inspection.  On January 28, 2011, officials from New Brunswick and Maine announced plans to build a new bridge and demolish the existing structure. Construction began on the new bridge in 2012 and the estimated completion date is June 30, 2014. It is expected to cost $13.9 million.

The new bridge opened on July 31, 2014. Demolition of the old bridge was underway by September 29, 2014.

Border crossing

The Fort Kent - Clair Border Crossing is at the Clair–Fort Kent Bridge on the Canada–United States border. This crossing first opened in 1905 with the construction of a footbridge that traversed the Saint John River. A replacement for the steel bridge that was built in 1930 opened July 31, 2014.

See also

References

Road bridges in New Brunswick
Canada–United States bridges
U.S. Route 1
Transportation buildings and structures in Aroostook County, Maine
Buildings and structures in Madawaska County, New Brunswick
Transport in Madawaska County, New Brunswick
Bridges of the United States Numbered Highway System
Bridges over the Saint John River (Bay of Fundy)
Bridges completed in 1930
International bridges in Maine
Road bridges in Maine
Steel bridges in the United States
Steel bridges in Canada
Truss bridges in Canada
Truss bridges in the United States
1930 establishments in Maine
1930 establishments in New Brunswick